Erik Sprague (born June 12, 1972), known professionally as the Lizardman, is an American freak show and sideshow performer. He is best known for his body modification, including his sharpened teeth, full-body tattoo of green scales, bifurcated tongue, subdermal implants and green-inked lips.

Early life

Sprague was born in Fort Campbell, Kentucky, and was a Ph.D. candidate at the University at Albany before beginning his transformation. He holds a Bachelor of Arts degree in Philosophy from Hartwick College in Oneonta, New York.

Career

As a professional freak, Sprague became famous for his heavy body modifications, including tongue bifurcation and tattooing. He regularly performs many classic sideshow acts such as the human blockhead, fire eating and breathing, gavage, sword swallowing, the bed of nails, the Human Dartboard, the cranial corkscrew, and the insectivore.

Sprague participates in many public and private flesh hook suspension groups and events, and is highly involved in the body modification community. He also writes articles on the Body Modification E-zine. His rock band, LIZARD SKYNYRD, released an album in late 2010 and performed in many tours around the world.

Sprague gained the official Guinness World Record for 'Most weight lifted and swung from the ear lobes' on the set of Lo Show dei Record in Milan, Italy on 19 Jun 2014. He also regularly performs with other sideshow celebrities and world record holders such as The Space Cowboy. 

He is featured in many of the "Ripley's Believe It Or Not" books and TV shows. As part of his work with the company, there is a life size statue of him in many of the company's museums.

Sprague has toured with The Jim Rose Circus and hosted the Jägermeister Music Tour, with bands including Disturbed, Slayer, and Slipknot.

Personal life

Sprague resides in Austin, Texas, with his wife Meghan and their pet ferrets.

Filmography

Film

Television

See also
Jim Rose Circus
Katzen
Lucky Diamond Rich
The Enigma
Tom Leppard
Chayne Hultgren

References

External links

Interviewed by Jessica Hopsicker in the College Crier

1972 births
People from Christian County, Kentucky
American circus performers
Living people
Ripley's Believe It or Not!
Sideshow performers
University at Albany, SUNY alumni
People known for being heavily tattooed
People known for their body modification